The Gibraltar Point Blockhouse was a blockhouse that was originally built in 1794 and was located on Gibraltar Point at the western end of the Toronto Islands. The first Lieutenant Governor of Upper Canada, John Graves Simcoe, planned defences for the mouth of Toronto Harbour at Fort York, along with the Gibraltar Point Blockhouse that was situated south of the harbour's entrance.

In 1800, a storehouse and guardhouse were added, but the battery was destroyed in 1813 and rebuilt as a blockhouse in 1814.
The blockhouse was two storeys tall, with the upper platform having no roof and with its floor consumed with a traversing carriage for a single cannon.

An oven permitted supplying the cannon with "hot shot"—cannonballs heated so they could start fires on the highly inflammable ships of the era.  The lower floor could barrack thirty staff.  The blockhouse's walls were formed from two parallel wooden walls, with the gap in between filled with tightly packed earth.

The blockhouse played no active part in the defence of York, when it was captured during the War of 1812. Most of the buildings on the Toronto Islands were destroyed by American forces at that time, excluding the Gibraltar Point Lighthouse.

During peacetime, the barracks at the Gibraltar Point Blockhouse were used to quarantine seriously ill individuals. The blockhouse was in ruins by 1823 and removed by 1833.

References

External links

Military forts in Ontario
Buildings and structures in Toronto
Blockhouses
1794 establishments in Canada
Buildings and structures completed in 1794